The Black Man's Land Trilogy is a series of documentary films on colonialism, nationalism and revolution in Africa, filmed in Kenya in 1970 and released in 1973, and still widely used in African studies programs internationally. The three titles are White Man's Country, Mau Mau, and Kenyatta.

John J. O'Connor of the New York Times called it "A solid historical document skewed, valuably, to a distinctive African point of view."

Credits
 Produced and directed by Anthony Howarth and David R. Koff
 Written by David R. Koff
 Photographed by Bruce Parsons and Mohinder Dhillon
 Sound recorded by Ivan Sharrock
 Edited by Roger Buck
 Music by Peter Frampton (White Man's Country)
 Narration and voice-overs by Msindo Mwinyipembe with Keefe West as the voice of Kenyatta
 Produced by Anthony David Productions, Inc.

Further reading
 Nicodemus Okioma and John Mugubi, "Filmmaking in Kenya: The Voyage", International Journal of Music and Performing Arts, June 2015, Vol. 3, No. 1, pp. 46–61 ISSN: 2374-2690 (Print) 2374-2704 (Online). Published by American Research Institute for Policy Development DOI: 10.15640/ijmpa.v3n1a5

References

External links
 
 
 
 "Black Man's Land: Images of Colonialism and Independence in Kenya; White Man's Country ep 1 of 3". "Black Man's Land: Images of Colonialism and Independence in Kenya; Mau Mau Crisis ep 2 Of 3". "Black Man's Land: Images of Colonialism and Independence in Kenya; Kenyatta ep 3 of 3". Kenya Digital Archives, via YouTube.

1973 documentary films
African studies
Documentary film series
Documentary films about African politics
Documentary films about African resistance to colonialism
Films shot in Kenya
American documentary films